Best of Cream is a compilation album of material recorded from 1966 to 1968 by the rock band Cream, and released shortly after their disbanding. The album was originally released by Cream's U.S. label Atco (Atlantic) Records (catalog no. SD 33-291), and was available on that label during the years 1969–1972. The album was briefly reissued in the U.S. in 1977 by RSO/Polydor Records, to whom U.S. distribution rights for Cream's recordings had reverted by that time.  A re-release was pressed in 2014 by Polydor on 180g vinyl (catalog no. 535 113-8).

Best of Cream was noteworthy upon its release as the first American album to contain Cream's studio recording of "Spoonful". Although included in international versions of Cream's 1966 debut album Fresh Cream, the song was deleted from Atco's initial U.S. release of the album, and replaced with the band's first hit single "I Feel Free". U.S. reissues of Fresh Cream contain both songs.

The album reached  on the UK album charts. The album was certified Gold by the RIAA.

Track listing

Side 1
 "Sunshine of Your Love" (Jack Bruce, Pete Brown, Eric Clapton) – 4:08
 Uncut version, from Cream's second album Disraeli Gears (1967), produced by Felix Pappalardi. Vocals: Jack Bruce/Eric Clapton.
 "Badge" (Clapton, George Harrison) – 2:45
 From Cream's fourth (and last original) album Goodbye (1969), produced by Felix Pappalardi. Vocal: Eric Clapton.
 "Crossroads" (Robert Johnson, arr. Clapton) – 4:13
 From Cream's third album Wheels of Fire (1968), produced by Felix Pappalardi. Recorded live at Winterland, San Francisco, California, 10 March 1968. Vocal: Eric Clapton.
 "White Room" (Bruce, Brown) – 3:04
 45 RPM single edit; uncut version appears on Wheels of Fire. Produced by Felix Pappalardi. Vocal: Jack Bruce.
 Early Spanish Polydor issues of the album (catalog no. 184298) include the uncut version of the song, running time 4:58.
 "SWLABR" (Bruce, Brown) – 2:31
 From Disraeli Gears. Produced by Felix Pappalardi. Vocal: Jack Bruce.

Side 2
 "Born Under a Bad Sign" (Booker T. Jones, William Bell) – 3:08
 From Wheels of Fire. Produced by Felix Pappalardi. Vocal: Jack Bruce.
 "Spoonful" (Willie Dixon) – 6:30
 Uncut version, from the international version of Cream's first album Fresh Cream (1966). Produced by Robert Stigwood. Vocal: Jack Bruce.
 "Tales of Brave Ulysses" (Clapton, Martin Sharp) – 2:50
 From Disraeli Gears. Produced by Felix Pappalardi. Vocal: Jack Bruce.
 "Strange Brew" (Clapton, Felix Pappalardi, Gail Collins Pappalardi) – 2:45
 From Disraeli Gears. Produced by Felix Pappalardi. Vocal: Eric Clapton.
 "I Feel Free" (Bruce, Brown) – 2:51
 From the U.S. version of Fresh Cream. Produced by Robert Stigwood. Vocals: Jack Bruce/Eric Clapton.

Personnel

Cream
 Jack Bruce – bass guitar, keyboards, vocals, harmonica on "Spoonful"
 Eric Clapton – lead guitar, rhythm guitar, vocals
 Ginger Baker – drums, percussion, vocals

Additional personnel 
 Felix Pappalardi – piano, viola
 George Harrison – rhythm guitar and backing vocals on "Badge"

Charts

Certifications

Citation

Cream (band) compilation albums
1969 greatest hits albums
Atco Records compilation albums
RSO Records compilation albums
Albums produced by Robert Stigwood
Albums produced by Felix Pappalardi